Shiva Ahmadi (born 1975) is an Iranian-born American artist, known for her paintings, videos, and installations. Her work has been exhibited at galleries and museums in North America and the Middle East.

Biography
Ahmadi was born in Tehran, Iran in 1975. Her upbringing, which is reflected in her art, was marked by the Iranian Revolution and the Iran–Iraq War. She obtained a bachelor of fine art from Azad University in 1998 and right after moved to USA to pursue her graduate studies.  She attended Wayne State University in Detroit, Michigan and received an Master of Art Degree in Drawing (2000) and a Master of Fine Arts in Drawing (2003). In 2003 she attended an artist residency at the Skowhegan School of Painting and Sculpture. In 2005 Ahmadi obtained her second MFA, in painting from Cranbrook Academy of Art. Ahmadi was appointed as an Associate Professor of Art at the University of California, Davis in 2015.

Career
Ahmadi's practice borrows from the artistic traditions of Iran and the Middle East to critically examine contemporary political tensions. Incorporating cultural symbols Ahmadi has taken a critical look at current social and political issues.

Ahmadi works across a variety of media, including watercolor painting, sculpture, and video animation; consistent through her pieces are the ornate patterns and vibrant colors drawn from Persian, Indian and Middle Eastern art. In her carefully illustrated worlds, formal beauty complicates global legacies of violence and oppression. These playful fantasy realms are upon closer inspection macabre theaters of politics and war: watercolor paint bloodies the canvas, and sinister global machinations play out in abstracted landscapes populated by faceless figures and dominated by oil refineries and labyrinthine pipelines.  Known for her achievements in painting, her later career has been marked by the use of video-animation. Her first animation Lotus was exhibited extensively in US and around the world and gained recognition from many critics and curators. Her latest animation titled Ascend (2017) was inspired by the death of Aylan Kurdi and Syrian refugee crisis in 2015. It was acquired by the Asian Art Museum in San Francisco.

Ahmadi's work is included in the collections of the Museum of Contemporary Art in Los Angeles, the Asia Society Museum, the Detroit Institute of Arts, the DePaul Art Museum, the Morgan Library & Museum, the Herbert F. Johnson Museum, the Asian Art Museum in San Francisco, the TDIC Corporate Collection in the United Arab Emirates, and the Farjam Collection in Dubai. Her piece Pipes, a five-feet wide watercolor, was acquired by the Metropolitan Museum of Art in 2014.

In 2016 she was awarded the Anonymous Was A Woman award.
In 2018 Ahmadi was awarded a fellowship at the Civitella Ranieri Art Residency in Umbria, Italy.

Exhibitions
2018– Burning Song, Haines Gallery, San Francisco
2018– This Land Is Whose Land?, Sun Valley Center For the Arts, Idaho
2018– Catastrophe and the Power of Art, Mori Art Museum, Tokyo, Japan
2017– Ascend, Leila Heller Gallery, New York, NY 
2017 – Rebel, Jester, Mystic, Poet: Contemporary Persians – Aga Khan Museum, Toronto, Ontario
2016 – Global/Local 1960–2015: Six Artists from Iran – Grey Art Gallery, New York, City
2016 –  Homeland Security, For-Site Foundation, San Francisco 
2016 –  Spheres of Suspension, Charles B. Wang Center, New York, NY
2014 – Shiva Ahmadi: In Focus – Asia Society, New York City
2014 – Artist in Exile: Creativity, Activism, and the Diasporic Experience, Geoffrey Yeh Art Gallery, New York, NY
2013 – Apocalyptic Playland – Leila Heller Gallery, New York City
2012 – The Fertile Crescent, Rutgers University Museum Exhibition, Newark, NJ
2011 – Art X Detroit, Museum of Contemporary Art, Detroit, MI
2010 – Shiva Ahmadi: Reinventing the Poetics of Myth – Leila Heller Gallery, New York City
2008--  Ahmadi and Zhang: Looking Back, Feldman Gallery, Pacific Northwest College of Art, Portland, OR.
2005 -- Oil Crisis, Leila Heller Gallery, New York, NY

Awards
2016 – Anonymous Was A Woman Award
2009 – Kresge Artist Fellowship, Kresge Foundation
2003 – First Prize, Michigan Fine Arts Competition 
2001 – Thomas C. Rumble University Graduate Fellowship, Wayne State University

See also 

 List of Iranian women artists

References

External links

Iranian women artists
American women artists
1975 births
Wayne State University alumni
Islamic Azad University alumni
Living people
21st-century American women
Iranian emigrants to the United States
Iranian painters
Iranian video artists
Iranian installation artists
American women painters
American women installation artists
American installation artists
American video artists